The Ford Warehouse, also known as the Simon Brothers Building, is located at 1024 Dodge Street in Downtown Omaha, Nebraska. It is a six-story brick and stone building constructed in 1919 and was added to the National Register of Historic Places in 1999. It is located near the Omaha Rail and Commerce Historic District and the site of the former Jobbers Canyon Historic District, and is three blocks from the Old Market Historic District. Additionally, the building is also in accordance with the patterns for significance detailed in the Warehouses in Omaha Multiple Property Submission.

About 
The building functioned as a multi-use facility leasing space to a variety of other commercial tenants, including the B.F. Goodrich Rubber Company, United Food Stores, Inc., Warren Oil Company, Ford Brothers Van and Storage Company, and Gooches Food Products
Company. It was the Ford Brothers Van and Storage Company that the building became known for.

See also 
 History of Omaha, Nebraska
 History of Nebraska

References 

Warehouses on the National Register of Historic Places
National Register of Historic Places in Omaha, Nebraska
Apartment buildings in Omaha, Nebraska
Industrial buildings completed in 1919
History of Downtown Omaha, Nebraska
Renaissance Revival architecture in Nebraska
John Latenser Sr. buildings
Commercial buildings on the National Register of Historic Places in Nebraska